Pierre Vincent (born 17 April 1964) is a French basketball coach. At the 2012 Summer Olympics he coached the France women's national basketball team.

After coaching youth teams within the federation, he took the head of the professional women's team of Bourges Basket from 2003 to 2011, obtaining many trophies, including four titles of French champion. He then joined the men's club of Villeurbanne, then Orléans Loiret Basket, before returning to women's basketball at Famila Schio.

In parallel with his club career, he was appointed coach of the French women's team, a position he held until August 2013. He won the 2009 European Championship in Latvia against Russia, the bronze medal of this competition two years later, then reached the final of the 2012 Summer Olympics in London, against the United States where the French won the silver medal. In 2013, he led the French team to another international medal, silver at the 2013 European Championship held in France.

Club experience 

 2003 - 2011 : Bourges Basket
 2011-2014: ASVEL Basket
 2014-2017 Orléans Loiret Basket
 2017-current: PF Schio

National Team Experience 

 1991 - 1997 : assistant of the U16 French National Team
 1993 : assistant of the Military French National Team, Bronze medal in the World Championship
 1997 - 1998 : U18 Women's French National Team
 1998 - 2002 : U18 Men's French National Team
 2008 - 2013 : Women's French national Team

Honors

French National Team

Women's 

 Eurobasket Women 2009: Gold Medalist
 Eurobasket Women 2011: Bronze Medalist
 2012 Summer Olympics: Silver Medalist
 EuroBasket Women 2013: Silver Medalist

Youth Teams 

 Gold Medalist at the 2000 U18 Men's European Championship.

Club 

 4 Times French Basketball Champion : 2006, 2008, 2009, 2011
 3 Times Finalist : 2004, 2005, 2007
 5 Times French Cup Winner : 2005, 2006, 2008, 2009, 2010 ;
 3 Times Winner of the Tournoi de la Fédération : 2006, 2007, 2008 ;
 Twide Italian Basketball Champion : 2018, 2019
 3 Times Winner of the Italian Supercup: 2018, 2019, 2020
 Twice Winner of the Italian Cup: 2018, 2021

See also 
 List of EuroBasket Women winning head coaches

References

French basketball coaches
French women's basketball coaches
ASVEL Basket coaches
Living people
1964 births